Clube DataRo de Ciclismo was a Brazilian UCI Continental cycling team that existed from 2000 to 2010 as an amateur team and Continental from 2011 until 2014. The team returned to the amateur ranks in 2015.

References

UCI Continental Teams (America)
Cycling teams established in 2000
Cycling teams based in Brazil
Defunct cycling teams